The Greek Film Critics Association or Pan-Hellenic Film Critics Association (PEKK) was founded in 1976. The first members included the Greek film critics Nino Fenek Mikelidis, Vasilis Rafailidis, Yannis Bakogiannopoulos and others. Since 1977, the association belongs to International Federation of Film Critics (FIPRESCI).

Nearly every year, the PEKK gives out awards during Thessaloniki International Film Festival. The Greek Film Critics Association Awards is one of the most important awards for the Greek cinema. The PEKK gives also out award during Short Film Festival in Drama, Greece.

Best Greek Films of all time
The members of PEKK have selected their list of the Best Greek Films of all time on three occasions: initially in 1986, for the 10th anniversary of PEKK; again in 2006, for the 30th anniversary of PEKK; and for a third time in 2016, for the 40th anniversary of PEKK.

1986 selection

2006 selection

2016 selection

See also
Greek Film Critics Association Awards

References

External links
Πανελλήνια Ένωση Κριτικών Κινηματογράφου – Official webpage

Film critics associations
1976 establishments in Greece
Organizations established in 1976
Film organizations in Greece
Non-profit organizations based in Greece